A sequential system may refer to:
Sequential medium in in vitro fertilization
Sequential dynamical system